Rockridge station is a Bay Area Rapid Transit station located in the Rockridge district of Oakland, California. Located in the center median of the elevated State Route 24 west of the Caldecott Tunnel, the station has a single island platform serving two tracks.

Service at Rockridge began on May 21, 1973, following the completion of the Berkeley Hills Tunnel.

The elevator to the platform is outside of the paid area. BART added a dedicated faregate for the elevator in 2022.

References

External links 

BART – Rockridge

Bay Area Rapid Transit stations in Alameda County, California
Stations on the Yellow Line (BART)
Railway stations in Oakland, California
Railway stations in the United States opened in 1973